is a former Japanese badminton player who is a singles specialist from Gifu Prefecture, Japan. Now she works at the human resources department NTT East badminton club. She was the women's singles champion at the 2009 Osaka International tournament. At the BWF Grand Prix tournament, she was the semi-finalists at the 2010 Dutch Open, 2011 Russian Open, and at the 2011 Indonesia Masters. Goto also competed at the 2010 Asian Games in Guangzhou, China.

Achievements

BWF International Challenge/Series
Women's singles

 BWF International Challenge tournament
 BWF International Series tournament

References

External links 
 

Living people
1983 births
Sportspeople from Gifu Prefecture
Japanese female badminton players
Badminton players at the 2010 Asian Games
Asian Games competitors for Japan
21st-century Japanese women